George Jinda was a Hungarian-American percussionist who co-founded the smooth jazz group Special EFX with Chieli Minucci in 1982. He died in 2002 from respiratory failure.

References 

 

American percussionists
Smooth jazz musicians
2002 deaths
Year of birth missing
GRP Records artists